The 1997 Kansas City Royals season was a season in American baseball. It involved the Royals finishing 5th in the American League Central with a record of 67 wins and 94 losses.

Offseason
 October 28, 1996: Mike Bovee and Mark Gubicza were traded by the Royals to the Anaheim Angels for Chili Davis.
 December 13, 1996: Jeff Granger, Joe Randa, Jeff Wallace, and Jeff Martin (minors) were traded by the Royals to the Pittsburgh Pirates for Jay Bell and Jeff King.
 December 16, 1996: Scott Cooper was signed as a free agent by the Royals.
 January 16, 1997: Ryan Thompson signed as a free agent by the Royals.
 January 28, 1997: Melvin Bunch was traded by the Royals to the Montreal Expos for Yamil Benítez.
 March 4, 1997: Doug Linton was released by the Royals.
 March 26, 1997: Ryan Thompson was released by the Royals.
 March 26, 1997: Bob Hamelin was released by the Royals.
 March 27, 1997: Michael Tucker and Keith Lockhart were traded to the Atlanta Braves for Jermaine Dye and Jamie Walker.

Regular season

Season standings

Record vs. opponents

Notable transactions
 April 17, 1997: Todd Van Poppel was signed as a free agent by the Royals.
 June 6, 1997: Todd Van Poppel was released by the Royals.
 July 15, 1997: Chris Stynes and Jon Nunnally were traded by the Royals to the Cincinnati Reds for Héctor Carrasco and Scott Service.
 July 29, 1997: Matt Treanor was traded by the Royals to the Florida Marlins for Matt Whisenant.

Roster

Player stats

Batting

Starters by position
Note: Pos = Position; G = Games played; AB = At bats; H = Hits; Avg. = Batting average; HR = Home runs; RBI = Runs batted in

Other batters
Note: G = Games played; AB = At bats; H = Hits; Avg. = Batting average; HR = Home runs; RBI = Runs batted in

Pitching

Starting pitchers
Note: G = Games pitched; IP = Innings pitched; W = Wins; L = Losses; ERA = Earned run average; SO = Strikeouts

Other pitchers
Note: G = Games pitched; IP = Innings pitched; W = Wins; L = Losses; ERA = Earned run average; SO = Strikeouts

Relief pitchers
Note: G = Games pitched; W = Wins; L = Losses; SV = Saves; ERA = Earned run average; SO = Strikeouts

Farm system 

LEAGUE CHAMPIONS: Lansing

References

1997 Kansas City Royals at Baseball Reference
1997 Kansas City Royals at Baseball Almanac

Kansas City Royals seasons
Kansas City Royals season
Kansas